Benjamin Cane is an Australian winemaker who currently owns Duke's Vineyard in the Great Southern region of Western Australia. He has made award-winning wines of different varietals across three continents, with pinot noir standing out as a true source of passion and inspiration.

Biography
Ben earned a B.S. in Organic Chemistry and Psychology at the University of Adelaide, South Australia and later received his postgraduate diploma in oenology in 1998. While at university, he worked in several wine-related jobs including in a vineyard and in a cellar and managing a bottle shop. After completing university, he took a job with Simon Gilbert Wine Services in the Hunter Region of New South Wales, Australia. His love for pinot noir began while working as an assistant winemaker at Arcadian Winery in Santa Barbara County, California. Once his tenure at Acadian was completed, he travelled through South America, Africa, Asia and Europe before returning to Australia where he became a vineyard manager in the Barossa Valley. Over the next five years, he held numerous jobs: working in the Languedoc; in New South Wales; at Domaine Dujac in Morey-St.-Denis, France; at De Bortoli Wines in the Yarra Valley region of Victoria, Australia; at Poderi Colla in Piedmont, Italy; and at Yalumba Wines in the Barossa Valley. These experiences gave him an insight into wine production in France and Italy.

Ben returned to the United States in 2006 and became a contract winemaker at Freestone Vineyards. In 2007 the Duncan Family of Silver Oak Cellars hired Ben as an assistant winemaker to Daniel Baron to develop the pinot noir program for Twomey Cellars, the sister winery to Silver Oak. The following year he began overseeing production of sauvignon blanc. Ben initially began producing wine from Twomey's Russian River Valley WestPin vineyard. He went on to expand the label's vineyard program to include fruit sourced from the Anderson Valley and Sonoma Coast Appellations, as well as the famed Bien Nacido Vineyard in Santa Maria Valley. His vision for Twomey was "to craft a wine that expresses the uniqueness and terroir of each vineyard site with finesse and balance, by blending old world techniques with new world innovation and technology." By 2013 he produced seven pinot noir vintages for Twomey. In October 2013 Ben left Twomey and took a Head Winemaker job at Westwood Wines, a boutique winery also within the Russian River Valley AVA of Sonoma County.

At Westwood Ben was hired to completely redesign the brand, winery and reputation of the small boutique winery that produced 4,000 cases. He oversaw the 23 acre estate vineyard planted to several pinot noir clones, chardonnay and Rhône varietals and worked alongside the biodynamic expert, Philippe Coderey, to achieve biodynamic certification for the estate in 2017. The wines were consistently given high points and accolades from several critics, including a triple crown at the Sonoma Coast Wine Challenge 2016.

In late 2018 Ben accepted a position as Winemaker at Cape Mentelle Winery in Margaret River, Western Australia (which was owned by Moët Hennessy Louis Vuitton at the time) and moved back to his home country with a strong desire to reconnect with the premium Australian wine industry. During three years at Cape Mentelle, Ben was an instrumental member of the winemaking team overseeing the production of 60,000-100,000 cases, assisted with the viticulture of 130ha of vines across Margaret River, and was the designated technical voice to represent the brand in market to trade, media and consumers, and in-house staff across LVMH.

Duke's Vineyard: 2022 brought exciting new developments for Ben. He and his wife, Sarah Date, took over Duke's Vineyard, a Halliday 5 Red Star-rated winery in the Great Southern wine region of Western Australia that has been established for over 20 years. Located at the foot of the Porongurups—a region that is just starting to realise its premium wine-producing potential—Duke's Vineyard is where Duke Ranson planted his first vines in 1999 on his 60th birthday. Most people thought he had lost his mind, but he persevered and that strategy proved him right. 

Producing dry Riesling, Cabernet Sauvignon and Shiraz, the wines are bracketed in several tiers: 

• The Single Vineyard wines form the entry level range, designed for accessible and immediate drinking though with some cellaring potential.

• The Magpie Hill Reserve range is the premium level, made from fruit from the crest of the vineyard where the vines dig deep for water, resulting in beautifully concentrated fruit. 

• A few special wines make up the Ultra Premium range, including a top tier Cabernet Sauvignon ('The First Cab') made from the Houghton clone and a 'Whole Bunch Shiraz' which is whole bunch fermented and is akin to a velvety Pinot Noir. Historically, Duke made 'The Morrissey' which was the only blend - 50/50 Shiraz and Cabernet - that was named after his friend Peter Morrissey who helped him plant the vineyard by hand. Ben and Sarah have a halo straight Cabernet wine in the works that will be called 'The Duke' to honour the legend who built this brand and also a top tier, barrel-fermented Riesling called 'K2.'

• The Invitational Vineyard range is made up of small lot wines from interesting sites around the Great Southern and Margaret River wine regions. Primarily sold at the cellar door and to the Wine Club, these wines are delicious and fun explorations of what is being grown in this part of Australia. All bottles in this range are adorned with bright and colourful artwork from Emily Jackson, an artist based in Margaret River whom Ben and Sarah commissioned to create an original piece that represents the various regions showcased in the range.

the wines from Duke's Vineyard have garnered many top awards, most impressively with the 2017 Magpie Hill Reserve Riesling being given the Wine of the Year Award by James Halliday in 2019, the first time a Riesling has ever been awarded 99 points in Australia. 

When Duke decided it was time to ease into retirement, he searched for four years to find the right person to take over his legacy brand and vineyard, a path that led him to Ben Cane. He and Ben share the same passion to make beautiful wines from an exceptional terroir, have the same appreciation for cool climate wines, and like to have a lot of fun in the process of making, enjoying and selling wine.

Ben and Sarah will continue to make Riesling (dry and sparkling), Cabernet Sauvignon (including a rosé) and Shiraz (including a sparkling) and will also add small lots of Gewurztraminer, Chardonnay, Shiraz, and Pinot Noir from surrounding high quality vineyards.  

Their first vintage has already garnered some accolades: In November 2022, established wine writer Ray Jordan gave the '22 Magpie Hill Reserve Riesling Best Riesling of WA. This is the current iteration of the wine that put Duke on the map.  

@HuonHooke of the Real Review gave a slew of high points after tasting through the portfolio in November 2022:

95pts - Magpie Hill Reserve Riesling 2022 

95pts - Single Vineyard Riesling 2022

95pts - Frankland River Riesling 2022 

94pts - Protea Sauvignon Blanc 2022

93pts - Maleeya Gewurztraminer 2022 

and acknowledged that the Magpie Hill Reserve Shiraz 2020 is ageing nicely (95pts).

Most recently, @ErinLarkin of Robert Parker's Wine Advocate (and previously with Halliday) also took the time to do an initial tasting and awarded these scores:

95+pts - Magpie Hill Reserve Riesling 2022 (the + means the wines have the potential to get even better with age)

94pts - Single Vineyard Riesling 2022

as well as noting that the 2021 Magpie Hill Riesling is also cracking along with 95pts.

Press
In 2021, Ben was awarded dux of the 52nd Advanced Wine Assessment Course (AWAC) hosted by the Australian Wine Research Institute. Consequently, he has been offered a place as an associate judge at a future National Wine Show of Australia in Canberra.

Cape Mentelle: Part of Ben's role at Cape Mentelle was being the face of the label in the international and domestic markets. He hosted wine dinners, poured at wine shows, visited wine retail outlets, hosted virtual tastings, and conducted tours, talking to customers and press along the way. In 2020 the brand celebrated its 50th anniversary, a significant milestone that was marked by several high level events and a marketing video collaboration with leading Australian lifestyle photographer Eugene Tan of Aquabumps.

Westwood: The wines were consistently given high points and accolades from several critics including a triple crown at the Sonoma Coast Wine Challenge 2016. As a result, Ben was tapped as a "Winemaker to Watch" in 2016 by Sonoma Magazine. Many others were excited by the prospect of Ben's contribution at Westwood such as The Terroirist and The Wine Write.

Twomey: Ben Cane's and Daniel Baron's wines for Twomey received considerable critical acclaim. The Napa Valley Register praised Ben's methods of winemaking and stated that the Twomey 2009 Bien Nacido Vineyard pinot noir contained fruit which "explodes in the mouth." They described the Twomey 2009 Russian River pinot noir as the most full-bodied of the four wines being produced, "with aromas and flavors of red berries and brown sugar, [and] just loads and loads of ripe fruit." The publication also said that the Twomey 2009 Sonoma Coast pinot noir was a "well-balanced wine, full-bodied and shows both ripe fruit and mineral notes on mid-palate. Layers of berry flavor, with a raspberry finish – even a hint of blueberry."

Sonoma Wine said Twomey's wines are a "marriage of classical French technique and an extraordinary California vineyard, [which] results in Twomey's distinctive, complex, and rich expression of luscious fruit." Twomey's 2009 Russian River Valley pinot noir was awarded first place in the American Wine Society's National Tasting Project in 2012. It was also awarded the runner-up prize out of a group of 60 pinots in the Pinot Cup competition at Chef Charlie Palmer's annual Pigs & Pinot event in Healdsburg, California. Eric Asimov of The New York Times wrote that Twomey's 2009 Anderson Valley pinot noir was "one of our favorites, bigger and softer but with both finesse and intensity." North Bay Biz wrote that in making appropriate vintages, "Cane adds whole clusters to the open-top fermentors and performs a cold soak lasting several days to extract the grapes' delicate flavors. During fermentation, the cap is gently pushed down every six hours to obtain color and aroma."

References

Australian winemakers
Living people
Australian expatriates in the United States
University of Adelaide alumni
Year of birth missing (living people)